Nagamori may refer to:

Places
 Nagamori Castle
 Nagamori Station
 Asaka-Nagamori Station

People
 Shigenobu Nagamori, CEO of Nidec, a manufacturer of micromotors 
 Mashita Nagamori, a daimyō of the Azuchi–Momoyama period